Lorraine is a hamlet and census-designated place (CDP) in the town of Lorraine in Jefferson County, New York, United States. The population was 174 at the 2010 census, out of 1,037 in the entire town of Lorraine.

Geography
The hamlet of Lorraine is in southern Jefferson County, northeast of the center of the town of Lorraine. The community sits in the valley of Big Brook on the northwestern edge of the Tug Hill Plateau.

Lorraine is at the intersection of County Routes 189, 93, and 92.

Demographics

References

Hamlets in New York (state)
Census-designated places in New York (state)
Census-designated places in Jefferson County, New York
Hamlets in Jefferson County, New York